Libor Janáček (born 23 July 1969) is a Czech former football midfielder. He played in the Gambrinus liga, making over 250 appearances over the course of ten seasons for FC Slovan Liberec and later Bohemians 1905.

References

External links

Profile at Bohemians website

1969 births
Living people
Czech footballers
Czech First League players
FC Slovan Liberec players
Bohemians 1905 players
Association football midfielders
FC Oberlausitz Neugersdorf players